John Grainger (3 April 1924 – 10 January 1983) was an English professional footballer who played as a winger.

Career
Born in Darton, Grainger began his career at Frickley Colliery before making 394 appearances in the Football League for Rotherham United and Lincoln City between 1947 and 1959.

He later played non-League football for Burton Albion.

Personal life
His brother Colin and cousins Jack, Dennis and Edwin Holliday were also all professional footballers.

References

1924 births
1983 deaths
English footballers
Frickley Athletic F.C. players
Rotherham United F.C. players
Lincoln City F.C. players
Burton Albion F.C. players
English Football League players
Association football wingers